Ranau Sports Complex (Malay: Kompleks Sukan Ranau) in Ranau, located at an altitude of  above the sea level,  from Ranau town (pekan Ranau), is a <1000  capacity all-seater, multi-purpose stadium that was built in 2005.

See also
 Sport in Malaysia

References 

Football venues in Malaysia
Athletics (track and field) venues in Malaysia
Multi-purpose stadiums in Malaysia
Sports venues in Sabah
2011 establishments in Malaysia
Sports venues completed in 2011